Echopraxia is a hard science fiction novel by Canadian writer Peter Watts. It is a "sidequel" to his 2006 novel, Blindsight, and the two novels make up the Firefall series.

Echopraxia follows the story of a biologist who gets caught up in a voyage into the heart of the Solar System among members of a transcendentalist monastic order and allies (including a vampire escaped from a research facility and her cadre of zombified soldiers) to investigate a mysterious signal seemingly coming from the mission sent to initiate first contact in Watts' previous novel. The cover art is by Richard Anderson.

The title refers to a psychological condition in which a person involuntarily mimics actions they observe.

In 2014, Watts participated in an online Q&A session on Reddit, where he personally answered questions about the novel.

Synopsis
The story, set on the eve of the twenty-second century, follows a parasitologist named Daniel Brücks, who accidentally finds himself trapped within a conflict involving several trans-human groups. Forced to escape into space, he boards the starship Crown Of Thorns, together with a varied crew that includes Valerie, a vampire; Lianna Lutterodt, a monastic apprentice; Jim Moore, a soldier; Rakshi Sengupta, the pilot; and the Bicamerals, a group of trans-humans able to share thoughts and brainpower without the need for verbal communication. They journey together towards the Icarus station, which captures energy from the Sun and uses it to power both Earth and the Theseus ship, currently on a mission to contact an extraterrestrial entity. Things change abruptly when they find in the station signs of an alien intelligence that the crew names Portia, based on the extraordinary intelligence that the spider of the same name showcases, despite its small brain.

During the trip, several secondary plot points are explored: the relationship between Daniel Brücks and his ex-wife, Rho, who decided to ascend to "Heaven", a custom virtual reality world for people who don't want to go on with their ordinary lives; the relationship between Jim Moore and his son, Siri Keeton, who traveled on the Theseus several years ago; Sengupta's search for the man who caused her wife's death; and Valerie's escape from the neurological chains that her human creators had imposed on her.

The book explores topics like the nature of consciousness and the actual need (or lack) for it in evolved creatures, the use of religion to advance knowledge beyond science, the existence of God as a virus that modifies the laws of physics, and the role that baseline (non-modified) humans can have in a society where everyone else is "augmented" in one way or another.

References

External links
 

2014 Canadian novels
2014 science fiction novels
Biopunk novels
Canadian science fiction novels
Space exploration novels
Tor Books books